{|

{{Infobox ship characteristics
|Hide header=
|Header caption= 
|Ship class=
|Ship type=Brig-sloop
|Ship tonnage=
|Ship displacement=
|Ship tons burthen=238 bm 
|Ship length=*Overall: 
Keel:  
|Ship beam= 
|Ship height=
|Ship draught= 
|Ship draft=
|Ship depth=
|Ship hold depth=
|Ship decks=
|Ship deck clearance=
|Ship ramps=
|Ship ice class=
|Ship power=
|Ship propulsion=Sails
|Ship sail plan=
|Ship speed=
|Ship range=
|Ship endurance=
|Ship test depth=
|Ship boats=
|Ship capacity=
|Ship troops=
|Ship complement=*Sloop-of-war:75
Survey voyages: On [[second voyage of HMS Beagle|Beagles second voyage]], 65 plus 9 supernumeraries 
|Ship crew=
|Ship time to activate=
|Ship sensors=
|Ship EW=
|Ship armament=*Sloop-of-war:2 × 6-pounder bow chasers + 8 × 18-pounder carronades
Survey voyages:6 guns
|Ship armour=
|Ship armor=
|Ship aircraft=
|Ship aircraft facilities=
|Ship notes=
}}
|}

The Cherokee class''' was a class of brig-sloops of the Royal Navy, mounting ten guns. Brig-sloops were sloops-of-war with two masts (a fore mast and a taller main mast) rather than the three masts of ship sloops.  Orders for 115 vessels were placed, including five which were cancelled and six for which the orders were replaced by ones for equivalent steam-powered paddle vessels.

Many of these sailing vessels served as mail packet ships, and more than eight assisted with exploration and surveys.

Design
The carronade, nicknamed the "smasher" or "devil gun", was significantly smaller and lighter than conventional cannon. It was also found to have a more destructive broadside at close range, so that a smaller (and cheaper) ship could be more effective in naval actions than a much larger man-of-war. Sir Henry Peake designed a small ship to operate in both shallow and deep waters, carrying eight 16-pounder or 18-pounder carronades plus two long 6-pounder cannon as forward-mounted chase guns.

Henry Peake completed the design for the Cherokee class in 1807. The design was approved on 26 November 1807, with the first four vessels having been ordered in March 1807 but not laid down until December; by the end of 1808 another thirty vessels had been ordered to this design. After these 34, another two were ordered in 1812 which were built of teak at Bombay.  The design was revived after the end of the Napoleonic Wars, and another 78 were ordered in two batches between 1817 and 1827.  The first batch of these later vessels consisted of 35 orders (of which one was cancelled) whilst the second amounted to 44 new vessels of which four were cancelled and six replaced by orders for paddle vessels.

The class was much criticised, being popularly known as 'coffin brigs', following the loss by wrecking or foundering of a number of them. There seems to have been no particular fault in their design, but they were considered to be somewhat too small for the global duties they took on. Almost a quarter of them were lost, and they were also nicknamed "Half Tide Rock" as they had low freeboard so the deck was frequently awash with water, and solid bulwarks preventing the water from being shed quickly.  William James, in his Naval History written before May 1827, dismissed the supposed design faults, and said that it would be "surprising indeed that the navy board would continue adding new individuals by dozens at a time" to "this worthless class". These open flush-decked ships lacked a forecastle to deflect heavy seas crashing over the bow: one was added to Beagle in 1825 before its first voyage, together with a mizzen mast which improved the handling. Despite these modifications to the design, Captain Pringle Stokes protested that "our decks were constantly flooded".

Further extensive modifications were made for the second voyage of HMS Beagle. Darwin noted in his journal in April 1833 that "It blew half a gale of wind; but it was fair & we scudded before it. — Our decks fully deserved their nickname of a "half tide rock"; so constantly did the water flow over them", but John Lort Stokes who was on all three survey expeditions praised Beagle: "The reader will be surprised to learn that she belongs to that much-abused class, the '10-gun brigs'—coffins, as they are not infrequently designated in the service; notwithstanding which, she has proved herself, under every possible variety of trial, in all kinds of weather, an excellent sea boat."

Service
Few of the Cherokee class ships took part in sea battles of any importance. Large numbers of them went on to serve as passenger and mail carrying packet ships, running from the UK to the USA and Canada.

Several assisted with exploration and survey expeditions, including , which served with William Fitzwilliam Owen's survey of the African and Arabian coasts between 1821 and 1826 before being converted to a barque-rigged packet in 1829 and then being sold in 1836.

The first voyage of Beagle set out in 1826 under Captain Pringle Stokes as part of Phillip Parker King's survey of South American coasts, which returned late in 1830 with Beagle by then commanded by Robert FitzRoy. Captain Henry Foster commanded HMS Chanticleer on his survey around the South Atlantic, known as his "pendulum expedition", from 1827 to 1831. Chanticleer was then intended to be used for FitzRoy's next survey expedition, but was found to be in poor condition. Instead, the Beagle was repaired and modified for its famed second survey voyage from 1831 to 1836, which took along the naturalist Charles Darwin as a self-funded supernumerary. The Beagle subsequently carried out a survey of coasts of Australia from 1837 to 1843 under John Clements Wickham and John Lort Stokes.

From 1838 to around 1841 , commanded by Owen Stanley, carried out survey work and other duties around Australia and New Zealand. Other survey ships of this class included HMS Fairy from about 1832 to 1840, Scorpion from 1848 to 1858 and Saracen from 1854 to 1860.

1808–1816 vessels
The first four vessels listed below were ordered on 30 March 1807, two more on 26 November 1807 and the next twenty vessels on 31 December 1807. Eight more orders were placed during 1808. All 34 were built by commercial contractors.

Two vessels were ordered 2 October 1812. These were built in India at the Bombay Dockyard under a contract from the British East India Company. They were built of teak, but were otherwise identical to their predecessors.

1818–1821 orders
Unlike the wartime batch, all the post-war batches were built in the Royal Dockyards rather than by contractors.  Note that several names of vessels from the 1808–1816 batch were re-used for vessels in the second or third batches (as indicated below).

Thirty-five vessels were ordered in 1817–1821 – twelve on 13 June 1817, twelve on 2 November 1818, two on 8 December 1818, six on 23 May 1820, one on 6 January 1821 and two on 19 April 1821.

1823–1826 orders
Forty-four vessels were ordered in 1823–1826, thirty on 25 March 1823, two on 23 November 1824, two on 7 December 1824, four on 23 May 1826 and six on 28 October 1826. Of these only thirty-four were built as sailing brigs; four were cancelled outright, and the orders for six more were replaced (before any work had commenced) by orders for paddle vessels, using the same names.

Six of the vessels originally ordered 25 March 1823 were swiftly re-ordered as paddle steamers in May 1824 – Alban and Carron (both at Deptford), Columbia, Confiance, Dee and Echo (all four at Woolwich).

References

 Rif Winfield, The Sail and Steam Navy List, 1815–1889 (Chatham Publishing, 2004)
 Rif Winfield, British Warships in the Age of Sail, 1793–1817 (2nd edition, Seaforth Publishing, 2009)
 Rif Winfield, British Warships in the Age of Sail, 1817–1863'' (Seaforth Publishing, 2014).

 , Volume 1, Volume 2

 
Sloop classes